Christophe Mandanne (born 7 February 1985) is a French professional footballer who plays as a striker.

Career statistics

Honours
Guingamp
 Coupe de France: 2013–14

References

External links
 
 

1985 births
Living people
French people of Réunionnais descent
Footballers from Toulouse
French footballers
Association football forwards
Ligue 1 players
Ligue 2 players
UAE Pro League players
Le Havre AC players
Tours FC players
Dijon FCO players
Stade de Reims players
En Avant Guingamp players
Fujairah FC players
AS Nancy Lorraine players
LB Châteauroux players
French expatriate footballers
French expatriate sportspeople in the United Arab Emirates
Expatriate footballers in the United Arab Emirates
Black French sportspeople